Reverb on the Click is the debut album by American rock band Rudy + Blitz, printed by guitarist Chad Ginsburg in the year 1995. There were an estimated of 500 copies released.

The re-printed version of Reverb on the Click was made by Ginsburg and released in 2003. There was a limited number of copies and they are now all sold out. A remastered edition of the album was released on October 8, 2021, through Bandcamp and all streaming platforms.

Track listing
"Turtle Frown"
"Refried Beans"
"Thanks Anyway"
"Type of Thing"
"Cut the Grass"
"PFD"
"Just About Done"
"Used It All Up"
"She's So Brown"
"Carmel My Dog"
"Teach"
"Poor Fly"
"Thanks Anyway (7" version)" (bonus track)
"Humbahdigiduh (7" version)" (bonus track)

2000 debut albums
Rudy & Blitz albums